NA-101 Faisalabad-VII is a constituency for the National Assembly of Pakistan.

Members of Parliament

2018-2022: NA-109 Faisalabad-IX

Election 2002 

General elections were held on 10 Oct 2002. Abid Sher Ali of PML-N won by 33,455 votes.

Election 2008 

General elections were held on 18 Feb 2008.  Abid Sher Ali of PML-N won by 59,616 votes.

Election 2013 

General elections were held on 11 May 2013. Abid Sher Ali of PML-N won by 103,176 votes and became the  member of National Assembly.

Election 2018 
General elections were held on 25 July 2018.

By-election 2023 
A by-election will be held on 19 March 2023 due to the resignation of Faiz Ullah Kamoka, the previous MNA from this seat.

See also
NA-100 Faisalabad-VI
NA-102 Faisalabad-VIII

References

External links
 Election result's official website

NA-084